Karaul is the name of selo in Kazakhstan:
Karaul, Abay District, East Kazakhstan, a selo in Abay District of East Kazakhstan

Karaul is the name of several rural localities in Russia:
Karaul, Bogorodsky District, Kirov Oblast, a village in Ukhtymsky Rural Okrug of Bogorodsky District of Kirov Oblast
Karaul, Kotelnichsky District, Kirov Oblast, a village in Kotelnichsky Rural Okrug of Kotelnichsky District of Kirov Oblast
Karaul, Kumyonsky District, Kirov Oblast, a village in Bereznikovsky Rural Okrug of Kumyonsky District of Kirov Oblast
Karaul, Taymyrsky Dolgano-Nenetsky District, Krasnoyarsk Krai, a selo in Taymyrsky Dolgano-Nenetsky District of Krasnoyarsk Krai
Karaul, Bardymsky District, Perm Krai, a selo in Bardymsky District of Perm Krai
Karaul, Inzhavinsky District, Tambov Oblast, a selo in Karaulsky Selsoviet of Inzhavinsky District of Tambov Oblast